Anodea Judith (born Judith Ann Mull, December 1, 1952, Elyria, Ohio) is an American author, therapist, and public speaker on the chakra system, bodymind (body/mind integration), somatic therapy, and yoga. Judith is the author of Wheels of Life: A User's Guide to the Chakra System. She has maintained a private practice for over twenty years and presents workshops nationally and internationally at holistic retreat centers, yoga studios, Neo-Pagan and New Age events and training institutes. She is a past president of the Church of All Worlds (1986–1993), a founder of Lifeways, a school for the study of the healing and magical arts (1983), and a founding member of Forever Forests. She is on the faculty of Kripalu Center for Yoga and Health, and she is the founder and director of Sacred Centers, a teaching organization focusing on Chakra studies. She has a son named Alex, and one of her brothers is actor and singer-songwriter Martin Mull.

Education and training
Judith's academic background includes a master's degree in clinical psychology from Rosebridge Graduate School of Integrative Therapy and a doctorate in Health and Human Services (focused on mind-body health) from Columbia Pacific University (an unaccredited, though state-certified, nontraditional distance learning school in California). Judith's studies in healing have included bioenergetics, psychology, psychotherapy, mythology, sociology, history, systems theory, and mystic spirituality. She is also an authority on chakras and yoga and somatic therapy. Her shamanic spiritual training led to ordination in 1985 through the Church of All Worlds, where she was a High Priestess for ten years.

Awards
Judith's book Waking the Global Heart: Humanity's Rite of Passage from the Love of Power to the Power of Love was the winner of the 2007 Nautilus Book Award Best Book of the year for Social Change and of the 2007 Independent Publisher Award Silver Medal for Mind/ Body Spirit.

Bibliography
 1987 – Wheels of Life: a User's Guide to the Chakra System. Llewellyn Worldwide, 
 1993 – The Sevenfold Journey: Reclaiming Mind, Body & Spirit Through the Chakras (with Selene Vega) Crossing Press, 
 1996 – Eastern Body, Western Mind: Psychology and the Chakra System as a Path to the Self. Celestial Arts, 
 2002 – The Truth About Chakras. Llewellyn Publications, 
 2002 – The Truth About Neo-Paganism. Llewellyn Publications, 
 2004 – Chakra Balancing Kit: A Guide to Healing and Awakening Your Energy Body. – Workbook and Cards, Sounds True, 
 2006 – Contact: The Yoga of Relationship. (with Tara Lynda Guber) Insight Editions, 
 2006 – Waking the Global Heart: Humanity's Rite of Passage from the Love of Power to the Power of Love. Elite Books, 
 2012 – Creating on Purpose: The Spiritual Technology of Manifesting Through the Chakras. (with Lion Goodman) Sounds True,

Audio
 The Chakra System: A Complete Course in Self-Diagnosis and Healing. – Six-tape audio course (Sounds True, 2000)
 The Beginner's Guide to the Chakras. (Sounds True; Abridged edition 2002) , 
 The Gaia Conspiracy. (ACE)
 The Energetics of Magic. (ACE 1993)
 Wheels of Life: A Journey Through the Chakras. – With Rick Hamouris (Cassette) (ACE/Llewellyn Collection, 1987) ; also released by same publisher on CD in 1992 with 
 What IS the Conspiracy, Anyway?. – Panel discussion with Robert Anton Wilson, Robert Shea, Rev. Ivan Stang & Jeff Rosenbaum (ACE)

Video
The Illuminated Chakras – A Visionary Voyage into Your Inner Worlds. (DVD) Sacred Centers 2004 , UPC 882157-930016

Notes

References
 Bond, Lawrence & Ellen Evert Hopman (1996) People of the Earth: The New Pagans Speak Out. (reissued as Being a Pagan: Druids, Wiccans & Witches Today in 2002 Destiny Books ) Interview.
 Carol, Shawna (2003) The Way of Song: A Guide to Freeing the Voice and Sounding the Spirit. St. Martin's Griffin , 
 Collins, Cynthia Jane & Jane Raeburn (2002) Building a Magickal Relationship: The Five Points of Love. C Trade Paper , 
 Croft, Candice A. (2005) Growing Good Hearts: The Rooting Years. Trafford Publishing , 
 Drew, A. J. (2002) Wicca for Couples: Making Magick Together. New Page Books , 
 Dunwich, Gerina (2001) The Modern Witch's Complete Sourcebook. Kensington Publishing 
 Seale, Alan (2001) Intuitive Living: A Sacred Path. Weiser Books; Revised edition , 
 Zell-Ravenheart, Oberon (2004) Grimoire for the Apprentice Wizard. New Page Books ,

External links
Anodea Judith's Sacred Centers website

1952 births
Living people
American spiritual writers
Columbia Pacific University alumni
American modern pagans
Modern pagan writers